Eloi Hubert "Lo" La Chapelle (22 June 1888 – 23 July 1966) was a Dutch footballer who played club football for amateur side HVV Den Haag. He also earned one cap for the Dutch national side in 1907, and participated at the 1908 Summer Olympics, winning a bronze medal.

References

External links
  Player profile at VoetbalStats.nl

1888 births
1966 deaths
Dutch footballers
Netherlands international footballers
Olympic footballers of the Netherlands
Footballers at the 1908 Summer Olympics
Olympic bronze medalists for the Netherlands
People from Bogor
Olympic medalists in football
Medalists at the 1908 Summer Olympics
Association football goalkeepers